Lord Granville Charles Henry Somerset PC (27 December 1792 – 23 February 1848) was a British Tory politician. He held office under Sir Robert Peel as First Commissioner of Woods and Forests between 1834 and 1835 and as Chancellor of the Duchy of Lancaster between 1841 and 1846.

Background and education
Somerset was the second son of Henry Somerset, 6th Duke of Beaufort, and Lady Charlotte Sophia, daughter of Granville Leveson-Gower, 1st Marquess of Stafford. Henry Somerset, 7th Duke of Beaufort, was his elder brother. He was educated at Christ Church, Oxford (2nd class classics 1813).

Political career
Somerset sat as Member of Parliament for Monmouthshire from 20 May 1816 until his death. He was a Lord of the Treasury under Lord Liverpool in 1820,  and served under Sir Robert Peel First Commissioner of Woods and Forests from December 1834 to April 1835, and as Chancellor of the Duchy of Lancaster from September 1841 to July 1846 (with a seat in the cabinet from May 1844). In 1834 he was sworn of the Privy Council.

In private life he was a member of the Carlton Club.

Family
Somerset married the Hon. Emily Smith, daughter of Robert Smith, 1st Baron Carrington, in 1822. They had five children:
Granville Robert Henry Somerset (7 January 1824 – 3 March 1881), married Emma Philadelphia, daughter of Sir George Dashwood, 4th Baronet, without issue
Emily Katherine Anne Somerset (29 January 1826 – 15 June 1908), married Col. Henry Ayshford Sanford on 10 May 1859, without issue
Constance Henrietta Sophia Louisa (c.1827 – 1 September 1893), married Rowland Smith on 20 August 1857 and had issue
Adm. Leveson Eliot Henry Somerset (29 August 1829 – 7 February 1900), married Efah, daughter of Col. Hon. Richard Thomas Rowley, without issue
Raglan George Henry Somerset (17 December 1831 – 2 September 1924)

He died in February 1848, aged 55, and is buried at Kensal Green Cemetery, London. Lady Granville Somerset died in January 1869.

References 

1792 births
1848 deaths
Burials at Kensal Green Cemetery
Chancellors of the Duchy of Lancaster
Younger sons of dukes
Granville Somerset
Conservative Party (UK) MPs for Welsh constituencies
UK MPs 1812–1818
UK MPs 1818–1820
UK MPs 1820–1826
UK MPs 1826–1830
UK MPs 1830–1831
UK MPs 1831–1832
UK MPs 1832–1835
UK MPs 1835–1837
UK MPs 1837–1841
UK MPs 1841–1847
Members of the Privy Council of the United Kingdom
Tory MPs (pre-1834)